VIFF may refer to:

 Vancouver International Film Festival
Vienna Independent Film Festival
 Vietnamese International Film Festival
Vilnius International Film Festival
 Vectoring in forward flight, a term  used in relation to the Hawker Siddeley Harrier and its derivatives